St. Mary's High School is a private Catholic primary and secondary school for boys, located in Peshawar Cantonment, Khyber Pakhtunkhwa, Pakistan. Founded in 1957, the school has been run by the Marist Brothers since 1970.

Administration
The school is run by the Diocesan Board of Education of the Roman Catholic Diocese of Islamabad-Rawalpindi. The Bishop of the diocese is the chairman of the board. The school is administered by the Marist Brothers, who took over the administration in 1970.

Academics
The school conducts classes from Prep to Class 10 (Secondary School Certificate of the Board of Intermediate and Secondary Education, Peshawar). The medium of instruction is English.

History
The school was opened in 1957 in the presbytery of St. Michael's Church on Mall Road , Peshawar Cantonment  with fourteen boys who had passed Standard III from Presentation Convent School located next door  to St. Michael's Church.  Fr. Thyssen  was the founder and first principal. The other teachers were Fr. Pingstern and Fr. Heideman.  All  three were Dutch citizens belonging to the  Catholic order of Mill Hill Fathers (London). Before his transfer to Peshawar, Fr. Thyssen was at Burn Hall, Abbottabad and before the Great Partition, he had served in Kashmir.

In 1958, the school moved to Air Force Barracks, on Roberts Road, as St. Mary's PAF Cambridge School. Classes available at the time ranged from Prep to Standard V. Fr.Joseph Beemster from Holland joined the teaching staff around this time

In 1962, the first batch of ten students sat for the Matriculation (SSC) Examination and the success rate was 100%. In the same year, five of its students qualified for GCE 'O' Level of Cambridge University (three in First Division).

The present site of St.Mary's High School was acquired for the school by Fr.  Michael Grant, an Irishman and the second principal of the school and the foundation stone laid by Lt. Gen. Altaf Qadir on 29 October 1963. Many parents contributed to the construction of the school by donating a truckload of bricks.  In 1970, the Marist Brothers took over the administration of St. Mary's from the Mill Hill Fathers. Br. Patrick Faulkner took over as the first Marist principal.

In 1977, Br. Francis Sales Fernando became the school's tenth principal. During his tenure as principal, many new buildings were added. The fully equipped auditorium, library, squash courts, hall for indoor games, children's park and mini zoo are some of those additions. Technical education was also introduced, with fully equipped workshops, around this time.

In 1993, Br. Charles Fernando took over as the principal. He was replaced by Br. Shanthi Liyanage who led the school until September 2005. During his tenure, a new spacious staff room was added to St. Mary's.

In 2005, students of St. Mary's secured the first position, third position and sixth position in the Board of Intermediate and Secondary Education SSC examination.

Golden Jubilee
On 29 March 2007, the school celebrated the Golden Jubilee of its foundation. At the time, the principal was Br. Devasiri Fernando FMS. The school had 1,302 students and 70 academic and administrative staff.

Faculty
 M Taha Khan, academic and author

See also

 Christianity in Pakistan
 Education in Pakistan
 List of schools in Pakistan

References

1957 establishments in Pakistan
Educational institutions established in 1957
Marist Brothers schools
Catholic elementary and primary schools in Pakistan
Catholic secondary schools in Pakistan
Schools in Peshawar
Boys' schools in Pakistan